Shelley is a British sitcom made by Thames Television and originally broadcast on ITV from 12 July 1979 to 12 January 1984 and from 11 October 1988 to 1 September 1992. It stars Hywel Bennett as Dr James Shelley, 28 years old (at the outset, although 35 by the sixth series only 4 years later) and a sardonic, perpetually unemployed anti-establishment 'freelance layabout' with a doctoral degree. In the original run, Belinda Sinclair played Shelley's girlfriend Fran, and Josephine Tewson appeared regularly as his landlady, Edna Hawkins. The series was created by Peter Tilbury who also wrote the first three series. The scripts for subsequent episodes were by Andy Hamilton and Guy Jenkin, Colin Bostock-Smith, David Frith, Bernard McKenna and Barry Pilton. All 71 episodes were produced and directed by Anthony Parker.

Series seven was titled on screen The Return of Shelley, and was broadcast in 1988. This time around, Shelley is (still) separated from Fran, and lives on his own, doing his best to avoid obtaining gainful employment. The series begins with Shelley returning to the UK from Kuwait after teaching English for several years, only to find that his calls to his old friends are now screened by answering machines and that yuppieness has taken root in his old neighbourhood. The final three series returned to the on-screen title of Shelley.

In the final series, Shelley is a lodger with Ted Bishop (David Ryall). Ted's house is the only one left in his street, the other residences having been demolished to make way for a leisure centre. Shelley moves in as lodger to help Ted with his fight against the developers who want to demolish the house Ted has lived in his whole life.

Characters
 James Shelley  known as Shelley or Perce (Hywel Bennett) - the protagonist, a usually unemployed terminal layabout qualified with a Ph.D. in geography who occasionally holds professional occupations, at one time being an advertising executive only to leave over a point of principle, another time working for the Foreign Office only to be made redundant before his starting date.  Shelley is obdurate, argumentative and awkward with a wry sardonic wit.  Shelley espouses left wing socially liberal views but is often shown to have reactionary tendencies and be somewhat of a hypocrite.  Shelley is usually honest about his unemployment and poor work ethic although occasionally likes to obscure it by claiming he is 'paid by the government' or is 'in leisure'.
 Francis Shelley (née Smith) known as Fran (Belinda Sinclair) - Shelley's long suffering girlfriend and later wife.  She is also unemployed although is an aspiring writer.  Like Shelley she is portrayed as being educated and is often the only person who can counter some of Shelley's more fanciful and obtuse arguments.  In the first series she becomes pregnant with Shelley's child, in the second series she has a book published and marries Shelley, in the third series she gives birth to a daughter, Emma.  At the start of the fifth series it is revealed she has left Shelley and she only appears in one episode.  She ceases to be a central character after this.
 Edna Hawkins known as Mrs H. (Josephine Tewson) - a somewhat waspish and prim landlady who lets a West Hampstead bedsit to Shelley and Fran in series one and two.  She often refers to 'her Willy', an unseen husband who it is implied is coerced by her into working both days and nights.  She is suspicious of Shelley and disapproves of his languid lifestyle.  She shows little restraint in verbally attacking Shelley although is often browbeaten by his eloquence; her attitude to Shelley softens over time. She has a son, Colin.
 Paul England (Warren Clarke) - Shelley's closest friend and best man (after being let down by the alcoholic Ned). Paul is shown to be a loyal friend  although unlike Shelley he is industrious and has a successful career. However, some of his lifestyle choices (for instance it is implied he sees prostitutes) show him to be less than upstanding.  Although coarser than Shelley, he doesn't attract the disdain from establishment figures that Shelley does, owing to his charm and self-restraint.  In series five he lets his flat to Shelley.
 Mrs Radcliffe (Madoline Thomas) - an elderly widow who rents a bedsit from 'Mrs H.', downstairs from Shelley and Fran.  She is portrayed to be somewhat senile and living in a state of near delusion.  She seems to enjoy a cordial relationship with Shelley although has conspiracy theories about the other residents, believing Fran to be a 'doxy' and Mrs H. to be a murderess who killed her first husband.  She appears only in series two and three.
 Desmond (Garfield Morgan) - a pompous warden in the flats to which Shelley moves in series five.  He is envious of the educated Shelley, believing him to be typical of a privileged generation which has grown up in a society where education is attainable by the masses.  He has an unrealistic appraisal of his own intelligence, seeing himself as an amateur poet and believing that he could have been recognised had he enjoyed the educational privileges of Shelley.
 Isobel Shelley (Sylvia Kay) - Shelley's mother, who is only sixteen years older than her son.  Like him, Isobel is outspoken and argumentative.  She holds views bordering on communism and lives a fairly non-conformist lifestyle.  She smokes cannabis and grows her own throughout her flat, a situation that concerns Shelley - not for moral reasons but because he doesn't want his mother to be sent to prison.  She has a sharp tongue and berates Shelley as an 'evil little capitalist' although she is shown to have a kinder side, re-mortgaging her flat so that Shelley and Fran can buy their house.

Minor characters
 Cyril (John Barron) - Shelley's pompous and ineffectual boss while he works as an advertising executive for Harper Mackintosh.  Cyril is old fashioned, self-important and rather detached from the realities of the company he runs and from contemporary life.  The character in many ways mirrors the character of 'CJ' played by Barron some years earlier in The Fall and Rise of Reginald Perrin
 Ned (David Pugh) - Raymond Kelly a.k.a. Ned is Shelley's first choice for best man, much to Fran's disapproval as she strongly dislikes him.  Ned is an irresponsible alcoholic who is often involved in pub brawling and it is implied is slowly drinking himself to death (something Ned is both aware of and completely indifferent to).  Although he only appears in one episode, he is mentioned several times thereafter or appears off-screen such as on the telephone.

List of episodes

Series 1 (1979-80)

Series 2 (1980)
Preceded by three episodes delayed from Series 1.

Christmas Special (1980)

Series 3 (1980-1)

Series 4 (1982)

Series 5 (1982)

Series 6 (1983-4)

Series 7 (1988)
For this series only, it was retitled as ‘The Return of Shelley’.

Series 8 (1989-90)

Series 9 (1990)

New Year Special (1991)

Series 10 (1992)

Book
The first series was rewritten as a novel, Shelley, by Colin Bostock-Smith and Peter Tilbury. New English Library, paperback, 1 April 1980. .

DVD releases
The first six series were previously released through Network on Region 2 DVD-Video between 2007 and 2012. The series 2 DVD only contains six episodes from the second series as broadcast: three episodes held over from series one (due to transmission of that series being postponed by the ITV technicians' strike of 1979) appear on the DVD release of that series.

A 6 disc set consisting the first six series, along with another set featuring series 7-10 were finally released on 20 November 2017.

References

External links
 
 
  (1979-1983)
  (1988-1992)

1979 British television series debuts
1992 British television series endings
1970s British sitcoms
1980s British sitcoms
1990s British sitcoms
English-language television shows
ITV sitcoms
Television series by Fremantle (company)
Television shows produced by Thames Television
Television shows shot at Teddington Studios